Eslamabad-e Gonbad (also Romanized as Eslāmābād-e Gonbad; also known as Eslāmābād) is a village in Fajr Rural District, in the Central District of Gonbad-e Qabus County, Golestan Province, Iran. At the 2006 census, its population was 1,412, in 317 families.

References 

Populated places in Gonbad-e Kavus County